C.J. Klaas (born August 23, 1983 in Rockford, Illinois) is an American soccer player who played for U.S. at the 2003 FIFA World Youth Championship and spent two seasons with the Seattle Sounders in the USL First Division.

Youth
Klaas was born and raised in Illinois, playing for the Chicago Magic which won the 1999 U-17 National Championship.  He then attended the University of Washington where he played on the men's soccer team from 2001 to 2004.  He was a first team All American in 2003 and 2004.  He graduated with a bachelor's degree in economics in 2005.

National team
Klaas was selected to the United States U-20 men's national soccer team which competed at the 2003 FIFA World Youth Championship.  The U.S. lost to Argentina in the quarterfinals.  He played in four matches, including the loss to Argentina.

Professional
Klaas played one season with the Chicago Fire Premier of the fourth division Premier Development League in 2001. The San Jose Earthquakes of Major League Soccer selected Klaas in the third round (thirty-second overall) in the 2005 MLS SuperDraft.  The Chicago Storm of Major Indoor Soccer League also selected Klaas with the second pick of the 2005 MISL College Draft.  Klaas chose not to sign with either the Earthquakes or Storm in order to finish his degree.  After completing it, he joined the Seattle Sounders of the USL First Division.  Klaas quickly cemented himself as a critical cog in the Sounders defensive scheme over the next two seasons.  However, he left the Sounders after the 2006 season.

Post-Soccer Career
Klaas joined Klaas Financial in 2007, which was founded by his father, Craig Klaas.  He is currently the president and CFO.

References

External links
GoHuskies.com: Player profile

Living people
American soccer players
Washington Huskies men's soccer players
USL First Division players
USL League Two players
Chicago Fire U-23 players
Seattle Sounders (1994–2008) players
1983 births
United States men's under-20 international soccer players
San Jose Earthquakes draft picks
All-American men's college soccer players
Association football defenders 
Association football midfielders